Emanoil is a Romanian-language masculine given name, and may refer to:

Emanoil Bacaloglu (1830–1891), Wallachian and Romanian mathematician, physicist, chemist, scubadiver, etc.
Emanoil Badoi (born 1975), Romanian football full back
Emanoil Bârzotescu (1888–1968), Romanian Major-General during World War II
Emanoil Bucuța (1887–1946), Romanian prose writer and poet
Emanoil Catelli (1883–1943), Moldovan politician
Emanoil Costache Epureanu (1823–1880), twice the Prime Minister of Romania
Emanoil Ion Florescu (1819–1893), Romanian army general, Prime Minister of Romania for a short time in 1876 and 1891
Emanoil Gojdu (1802–1870), Romanian lawyer in the Austrian Empire
Emanoil Hasoti (born 1932), Romanian football forward
Emanoil Ionescu (1887–1949), Romanian General during World War II and commander of the Romanian Air Force's Corpul I Aerian
Emanoil Porumbaru (1845–1921), Romanian politician, Minister of Foreign Affairs of Romania 1914–1916
Emanoil Răducanu (1929–1991), Romanian basketball player who competed in the 1952 Summer Olympics
Emanoil C. Teodorescu (1866–1949), Romanian botanist

See also
Emanuel (disambiguation)
Emmanouil

Romanian masculine given names